Billy Frazer (born 30 December 2002) is a New Zealand racing driver. He currently competes in the U.S. F2000 National Championship with Exclusive Autosport.

Racing career

Toyota Racing Series 
After winning the New Zealand Formula Ford title in 2020, it was announced on 13 December 2020, that he would move to the Toyota Racing Series in 2021 with M2 Competition. Frazer ended up finished third in 2021.

U.S. F2000 National Championship 
On the 11 February, 2021, it was announced that Frazer would compete in the U.S. F2000 National Championship with Exclusive Autosport alongside his Toyota Racing Series campaign that same year.

After his rookie season in 2021, Frazer would compete in the championship in 2022 again with Exclusive Autosport.

Racing record

Career summary 

* Season still in progress.

American open-wheel racing results

U.S. F2000 National Championship 
(key) (Races in bold indicate pole position) (Races in italics indicate fastest lap) (Races with * indicate most race laps led)

* Season still in progress.

Complete Formula Regional Oceania Championship Results
(key) (Races in bold indicate pole position) (Races in italics indicate fastest lap)

References 

2002 births
Living people
New Zealand racing drivers
U.S. F2000 National Championship drivers

Toyota Racing Series drivers
M2 Competition drivers